The Christian Community is an esoteric Christian denomination. It was founded in 1922 in Switzerland by a group of ecumenically oriented, mainly Lutheran theologians and ministers led by liberal theologian Friedrich Rittelmeyer, who had been the most prominent representative of liberal Lutheranism in Germany during the First World War and whose early theological work had focused on the concept of a socially engaged "Christianity of deeds" (Tatchristentum). Rittelmeyer and the other founders were inspired by Rudolf Steiner, the Austrian philosopher and founder of anthroposophy.

The community has its historical roots partially in the broader liberal Christian tradition, and partially in the esoteric and gnostic tradition as well as German new humanism, as well as anthroposophy, though The Christian Community was a separate movement founded by Rittelmeyer, and most anthroposophists are not members of The Christian Community. Christian Community congregations exist as financially independent groups with regional and international administrative bodies overseeing their work. There are approximately 100,000 worldwide. The international headquarters are in Berlin, Germany. Its first priests included three women, and it was one of the first Christian denominations to practise the ordination of women. Women such as Maria Darmstädter played a major role in the development of The Christian Community.

The Christian Community is led by the "circle of priests," with leaders known as coordinators appointed within the circle. A first coordinator (Erzoberlenker) is consulted by two second coordinators (Oberlenkers). There are also third coordinators (Lenkers) on the regional level and a synod of priests.

The Christian Community is primarily a liturgical community, and practises freedom of teaching. It does not have an official theology or articles of belief, does not accept the concept of Christian dogmas, and does not engage in missionary work. The community also views other religions as equally valid as Christianity. Its rejection of Christian dogmas and its views of other religions have led some theologians of other denominations to question whether The Christian Community is truly Christian. The Christian Community in Germany was banned by the Nazis in 1941 and its leader Emil Bock imprisoned due to the community's alleged "Jewish" and "Masonic" nature, but the community continued its activities in Switzerland and England, and was reestablished in West Germany after the war.

Practice

The Christian Community does not require its members to conform to any specific teaching or behaviour. Seven sacraments are celebrated within the community: the Eucharist, generally called the Act of Consecration of Man, and six other sacraments: Baptism, Confirmation, Marriage, the Last Anointing, Sacramental Consultation (replacing Confession), and Ordination. There is also a special Sunday service for children of school age.

Rituals and sacraments are the same wherever they are celebrated. Services are generally celebrated in the language of the country in which they celebrated. The Act of Consecration of Man lasts approximately one hour. Sunday services are longer than weekday services because they contain a sermon in addition to holy communion. For the sacramental wine used in communion non-fermented grape juice is used rather than alcoholic wine. Three Christmas services are celebrated, one on December 24 (at midnight) and two on December 25. There are also added prayers for different liturgical seasons of the year.

Some chapels have an organ, and occasionally the organ has quarter tones in addition to the conventional (equal temperament) tuning.

Tenets
The Christian Community practices a complete freedom of teaching. The Priests may exert this freedom of teaching, provided that they do not contradict the sacraments which they celebrate. There is no official theology, nor articles of belief. Whatever is taught or written is a personal view.

Basic tenets of some priests of the Christian Community are 1) free will, 2) reincarnation and 3) focus on Christ. For example, Jesus of Nazareth is seen as a physical vessel that enabled the spiritual being called Christ to influence the world.

The ideology of some priests of the Christian Community could be summarized with the following points:
 Modern man requires modern religion (movement)
 The soul is immortal via reincarnation
 Jesus and Christ are separate entities, focus is on both. When Christ is spoken of in the sacraments, it is “Christ Jesus”, the risen Christ Jesus that is meant.
 Christ is both external and internal reality (Christ is not only ‘out there’ but at the same time ‘in here’)
 The New Testament should have priority over other documents in Christianity
* No missionary work or public marketing should be done because finding this religion should be based on free will.
<div>

Ecumenical relations
The Christian Community is one of several faiths, including Mormonism and the Salvation Army, whose baptisms are not considered valid by the Roman Catholic Church. The Evangelical Church in Germany also does not accept the Christian Community's baptisms, however, neither does it deny its Christianity. A study commissioned by the World Council of Churches in 1950 recommended it be accepted into membership in the organization, however, its application was ultimately refused. The community itself states it operates "without attachment to any existing church or ecumenical movement".

See also

 Anthroposophy
 Rudolf Steiner
 Berthold Wulf

References

External links
 The Christian Community in North America with extensive introductory articles
 The Christian Community in the UK and Ireland also with introductory articles
 The Christian Community in Ireland Based in the Republic of Ireland with services mainly in County Clare.
 Die Christengemeinschaft German site of The Christian Community
 The Christian Community in Australia and New Zealand with full programmes for all congregations in the region
 priest seminaries of the Christian Community in Spring Valley, NY, Stuttgart (Germany) and Hamburg (Germany)
 The Christian Community – An Introduction by Michael Tapp, retired priest in The Christian Community, former national coordinator for the UK and then Australia/New Zealand
 The Journal for the renewal of religion and theology An online peer-reviewed open access journal inspired by the theology of The Christian Community ( (now defunct; access via Archive.org)
 Religion Section at the Rudolf Steiner Archive an On-line Library

New religious movements
Liberal Christianity denominations
Christian organizations established in 1922
Esoteric Christianity
Anthroposophy